Zinskauf ("purchase interest") was a financial instrument, similar to an annuity, that rose to prominence in the Middle Ages. The decline of the Byzantine Empire led to a growth of capital in Europe, so the Catholic Church tolerated zinskauf as a way to avoid prohibitions on usury. Since zinskauf was an exchange of a fixed amount of money for annual income it was considered a sale rather than a loan. Martin Luther made zinskauf a subject of his Treatise on Usury and his Sermon on Trade and Usury and criticized clerics of the Catholic Church for violating the spirit if not the letter of usury laws.

In one historian's analysis:

References

Medieval economics